The Ministry of Lands, Housing and Human Settlements Developments is a government ministry of Tanzania that "has been mandated to administer land and human settlement" in the country.

References 

L
Tanzania
Tanzania